Coptobasis is a genus of moths of the family Crambidae.

Species
Coptobasis arctalis (Guenée, 1854)
Coptobasis dentalis Pagenstecher, 1900
Coptobasis lophocera Hampson, 1907
Coptobasis luminalis Lederer, 1863
Coptobasis mesospectralis Hampson, 1897
Coptobasis moellingeri Snellen, 1895
Coptobasis monochromalis (Walker, 1865)
Coptobasis opisalis (Walker, 1859)
Coptobasis ridopalis Swinhoe, 1892
Coptobasis spretalis Lederer, 1863
Coptobasis sulcialis (Walker, 1859)
Coptobasis textalis Lederer, 1863

Former species
Coptobasis lunalis (Guenée, 1854)

References

Spilomelinae
Crambidae genera
Taxa named by Julius Lederer